The Rockland Turntable and Engine House are a historic railroad maintenance facility in Rockland, Maine. The turntable and engine house were built in 1921, and are a significant reminder of the railroad's historic importance to the development of the city.  The facilities were listed on the National Register of Historic Places on June 24, 1993.

Description and history
The engine house is a wedge-shaped wood frame building, two stories in height, with a flat roof, clapboard siding, and a concrete foundation.  on the inner (east-facing) side of the wedge there are five entry bays, four of which retain track-mounted doors. The front portion of the building is only one story, with the rear having an elevated roof with monitor-style windows overlooking the front.

The outer portion of the turntable rests on a rail attached to the concrete retaining wall that encircles the structure. A small operator's shed stands at the western edge of the turntable.

These facilities were built in 1921, as a replacement for older structures.  Because Rockland was at the end of the line, a turntable was built here in 1871, not long after service began on the line.  The present turntable and engine house are the only known structures in the state to survive in this state of preservation.

Gallery

See also
Conway Junction Railroad Turntable Site, where only foundations survive
National Register of Historic Places listings in Knox County, Maine

References

Transportation buildings and structures in Knox County, Maine
Buildings and structures in Rockland, Maine
Historic districts on the National Register of Historic Places in Maine
National Register of Historic Places in Knox County, Maine
Railway depots on the National Register of Historic Places
Railway roundhouses on the National Register of Historic Places
Railroad roundhouses in Maine
Railway turntables
Engine houses
Railway buildings and structures on the National Register of Historic Places in Maine
Industrial buildings and structures on the National Register of Historic Places in Maine